The Steal is the debut studio album by hardcore punk band The Steal. It was released on CD by Gravity DIP.

Releases
January 2006 - On Gravity DIP, CD

Track listing
Breakout
Little Dip
World Wide World
Libidon't
Waiting For The Simple Life
The Steal
Clothing Rack
Strength In Community
Living For The Weekend
Up In Smoke
Door To Door
New Friend
Loudest Voices
Wonderstuff

External links
 The Steal Cd

The Steal albums
2006 albums
Gravity DIP albums